Pushkin Industries is an American publisher of podcasts and audiobooks. It was co-founded in 2018 by Malcolm Gladwell and Jacob Weisberg. As of 2021, it hosts over 25 podcasts.

History
The company was co-founded in 2018 by Malcolm Gladwell and Jacob Weisberg, based on the idea by Weisberg. The two worked together on Gladwell's podcast Revisionist History at Panoply Media and after the company exited the medium, the two wanted to do more projects together and decided to start Pushkin. 

In 2019, Pushkin began producing audiobooks starting with Gladwell's Talking to Strangers: What We Should Know about the People We Don't Know. In 2019, Tim Harford launched his podcast Cautionary Tales on the podcast network.

Among other books, it published Miracle and Wonder: Conversations with Paul Simon, co-written by Gladwell and based on interviews with the musician Paul Simon. Gladwell's The Bomber Mafia was written and conceived of as an audio production with sound effects and music, only after the script was complete was a book produced.

In July 2022, Pushkin Industries agreed to buy the podcast studio Transmitter Media, marking the company's first acquisition.

Pushkin Industries won "Podcast Network of the Year" at the 2021 Adweek Podcast Awards.

References

Audiobook companies and organizations
Mass media companies established in 2018
2018 establishments in New York City